Keith E. Sonderling is an American lawyer and government official. He currently serves as a Commissioner on the Equal Employment Opportunity Commission, previously serving as Vice Chair. He was confirmed by the Senate on September 22, 2020. Prior to the EEOC, he served as the Acting and Deputy Administrator of the Wage and Hour Division of the United States Department of Labor.  Before joining the government in 2017, he practiced Labor and Employment Law at the Florida-based Gunster Law Firm in West Palm Beach, Florida.

Career 
Sonderling began his legal career at the Gunster Law Firm in West Palm Beach, Florida. At Gunster, he practiced Labor and Employment law throughout his tenure at the firm. Sonderling was elevated to Shareholder in 2015. In 2012, Florida Governor Rick Scott appointed Sonderling to serve as a Commissioner on the 4th District Court of Appeal Judicial Nominating Commission. The Judicial Nominating Commission selects nominees to fill judicial vacancies within the Florida court system. In 2016, his fellow Commissioners elected him Chair.

United States Department of Labor

In September 2017, Sonderling joined the United States Department of Labor's Wage and Hour Division. In 2019, Sonderling served as the Acting Administrator of the Wage and Hour Division responsible for overseeing, administering, and enforcing some of the Nation's most comprehensive Federal labor laws including: the Fair Labor Standards Act, the Family Medical Leave Act, and the labor provisions of the Immigration and Nationality Act.

As Deputy Administrator, Sonderling oversaw enforcement, outreach, regulatory work, strategic planning, performance management, communications, and stakeholder engagement. During his tenure, the Agency accomplished back-to-back record-breaking enforcement collections and educational outreach events. Sonderling oversaw the development and publication of large-scale deregulatory rules, authored numerous Opinion Letters,  Field Assistance Bulletins, and All Agency Memorandums.

While serving as Acting Administrator, Sonderling issued an Opinion Letter regarding the Department's first-ever legal analysis of the gig economy. Opinion Letter FLSA2019-6 addressed whether a service provider for a virtual marketplace company is an employee of the company or an independent contractor under the FLSA. The letter responded to a request on behalf of a particular virtual marketplace company. It concluded that the workers who provide services to consumers through this specific company's virtual platform are independent contractors, not employees of the company. Sonderling also issued proposed rules for marquee labor issues such as updating the overtime threshold and joint employer standards under the FLSA.

Sonderling was also instrumental in developing the Payroll Audit Independent Determination (PAID) the Agency's first comprehensive self-audit program.  PAID's primary objectives are to resolve claims expeditiously and without litigation, to improve employers’ compliance with overtime and minimum wage obligations, and to ensure that more employees receive the back wages they are owed. The program recovered $7 million in wages to 11,000 workers.

United States Equal Employment Opportunity Commission (EEOC)

On July 3, 2019, President Donald J. Trump nominated Sonderling to be a member of the Equal Employment Opportunity Commission for a term expiring July 1, 2024. In October 2019, a coalition of 19 business associations sent a letter to the United States Senate HELP Committee in support of Sonderling's nomination. Associations included the Associated General Contractors, National Restaurant Association, National Retail Federation, American Hotel and Lodging Association, and U.S. Chamber of Commerce. On June 3, 2020, the United States Senate Health Education Labor and Pension Committee, by unanimous consent, favorably reported his nomination. On September 22, 2020, Sonderling was confirmed by the Senate 52–41. He was sworn-in on September 30, 2020, and was also designated by the President to serve as Vice Chair of the Commission. 

One of Commissioner Sonderling’s highest priorities is ensuring that AI-informed employment technologies are designed and deployed in ways that make the workplace more fair and inclusive. Commissioner Sonderling published numerous articles on the benefits and potential harms of using artificial intelligence-based technology in the workplace and speaks globally on these emerging issues.  His approach to regulating technology and human resources has been featured in numerous publications including, The Wall Street Journal, Bloomberg, and Law360.

In addition to his duties as Commissioner, Sonderling currently serves as a Professorial Lecturer in Law (Adjunct Professor) at the George Washington University Law School teaching Employment Discrimination.

Education 
Sonderling received a Bachelor of Science, magna cum laude, from the University of Florida and his Juris Doctor., magna cum laude, from Nova Southeastern University.

References 

21st-century American lawyers
1982 births
Living people
University of Florida alumni
United States Department of Labor officials
Jewish American government officials
American labor lawyers
Florida lawyers
Equal Employment Opportunity Commission members
21st-century American Jews
University of Florida College of Journalism and Communications alumni